National Militia, the most numerous part of the Serbian Army between 1861 and 1882. It was a territorial militia composed of all able-bodied men of the Principality of Serbia aged 20 to 50, formed into territorial units, who were obliged to do military training on Sundays in their towns and villages under the command of a few professional officers. Poorly trained, ill-equipped and undisciplined, these militia units performed poorly during the Serbian-Ottoman Wars (1876-1878) and were disbanded in 1882. In 1883, some of the units rebelled against the Government, but were defeated in the short-lived Timok Rebellion.

Formation 
As Principality of Serbia gained it's autonomy within the Ottoman Empire as a vassal state in 1830, a small Serbian Regular Army was established in order to protect the peace within its borders. It was armed and uniformed in the European fashion, trained by the former Austrian and Russian officers: by 1860, it had no more than 3,500 professional soldiers.

In 1861. Prince Mihailo Obrenović (1860–1868), adopted a new Law on the National Militia, which included military service for men between the ages of 20 and 50 who were trained locally.

In August 1861, a law was duly passed making all able-bodied men between the ages of twenty and fifty liable for military service. Those between twenty and thirty were to train on Sundays and holidays, while the rest were reservists, obliged to train on a monthly basis. Within ten years, Serbia could field a massive force of some 90,000 men out of a population of one and a quarter million. The construction of an army at lightning speed was accompanied by tremendous patriotic fervour: songs hailing Serbia's great military traditions; articles predicting an imminent revolutionary war which would sweep the Turks out of Europe and keep the Austrians at bay; and endless slogans. ‘Educated Serbs even liked to boast of being a modern Sparta, the Piedmont of the South Slavs or, better yet, the Prussia of the Balkans’, as a historian of modern Serbia has remarked. In this respect, the militarization of Serbia, based on the peasantry, fostered a novel nationalist ideology in which the masses, and not just the bureaucratic elite, played a historic role. But it also created a dangerous illusion, as sheer numbers did not make an army. Discipline, clothing, medical support, proper logistics and, above all, an abundant supply of weapons and well-trained officers did. The new Serbian military could fulfil none of these requirements, as the country was to learn dramatically during the First Serbian-Ottoman War of 1876. By the time of his assassination in 1868, Prince Michael was almost certainly aware of these deficiencies, as he had invited foreign delegations to assess his army. Their observations were uniformly dismissive.

Organisation 
People's Militia was divided into the "First Class" (men under the age of 35) and the "Second Class", organized into territorial battalions (62 in number) and regiments (17, one in each county). There were also 17 squardons of cavalry, 17 pioneer units of 60 men each, and 6 artillery batteries (1,200 men). In 1861, First Class could field about 50,000 men, the Second about 40,000. Every county had its own military department, with several regular officers and NCOs, who organized recruitment, supplies, armament and training of National Militia. Military training was done on Sundays and holidays: battalions trained for two days every other week, and regiments 15 days a year. NCOs and officers under the rank of captain were selected from the common people, mostly peasants, by the county elders, battalion and squadron commanders were selected by the Minister of War, and regiment commanders were appointed by the Prince.  In 1866, new military schools were opened in Belgrade and Kragujevac, to provide Militia officers with basic training in tactics, fortification and topography.

In 1876, the National Militia was formed in brigades: each county was to equip one brigade of the First and one the Second Class (in total 18 of each class), as well as a battalion of the "Third Class" (men over the age of 50). Brigades of the First Class were organized into 6 divisions. However, battalions were the main operational units, and were used independently of their brigades and divisions. In 1876. there was 80 battalions of the First Class, 80 battalions of the Second Class and 18 battalions of the Third Class.

Equipment

Firearms 
Military service was without pay, and militiamen were expected to provide their own weapons and clothing. In 1862, the Serbian People's Militia existed on paper only: less than a half of the militiamen had serviceable rifles, mostly old Austrian and Otoman flintlock muskets.

Since 1856, Serbia had its own weapons factory in Kragujevac, which produced light bronze cannon and copper percussion caps, and by 1862 have converted some 15,000 old flintlock muskets into percussion rifles. In 1863. Serbia received some 31.000 (or 39.200) old percussion muskets from Russia (Russian musket model 1845): these muskets vere converted to rifles in Kragujevac and became the standard weapon of the National Militia, known in Serbia simply as the Russian rifles.

In 1867, the first Serbian breechloading rifles (Green model 1867) were made in Belgrade Arsenal, by converting some 27,000 cheaply bought Austrian decommissioned Lorenz rifles. In 1870, the Serbian army adopted new, much better breechloading rifle (Peabody model 1870), converting some 28.000 imported Belgian percussion rifles.

Uniforms 
In 1876, units of the First Class were given state-issued uniforms (hats, coats, trousers and greatcoats) and were armed with  breechloading rifles (mostly newer Peabody model 1870). Units of the Second Class were supposed the be at least partially uniformed (hats and greatcoats), but in practice mostly wore their own civilian clothes: few were armed with older Green model 1867 breechloading rifles, but most had only Russian and Belgian percussion muzzleloaders.

Rerences 

History of Serbia
1861
1882
Coordinates on Wikidata
Serbian Army